The 2021 Copa Sudamericana Final was the final match which decided the winner of the 2021 Copa Sudamericana. This was the 20th edition of the Copa Sudamericana, the second-tier South American continental club football tournament organized by CONMEBOL.

The match was played on 20 November 2021 at the Estadio Centenario in Montevideo, Uruguay, between Brazilian sides Athletico Paranaense and Red Bull Bragantino.

On 13 May 2021, CONMEBOL announced that the final would be played at the Estadio Centenario in Montevideo, Uruguay on 6 November 2021.

Athletico Paranaense defeated Red Bull Bragantino by a 1–0 score in the final to win their second title in the tournament. As winners of the 2021 Copa Sudamericana, they earned the right to play against the winners of the 2021 Copa Libertadores in the 2022 Recopa Sudamericana. They also automatically qualified for the 2022 Copa Libertadores group stage.

Venue 

On 13 May 2021, CONMEBOL announced that Estadio Centenario, Montevideo was chosen as the 2021 final venue.

Road to the final

Note: In all scores below, the score of the home team is given first.

Match

Details

See also 

 2021 Copa Libertadores Final
 2022 Recopa Sudamericana

References

External links 
 CONMEBOL.com

2021
Final
2021 in South American football
November 2021 sports events in South America
Club Athletico Paranaense matches